The Angels Hotel in Angels Camp, California, was the hotel where the author Mark Twain heard a story that he would later turn into his short story "The Celebrated Jumping Frog of Calaveras County".

The hotel was originally a canvas tent erected by C. C. Lake in 1851, and replaced by a one-story wooden structure. It was rebuilt with stone in 1855, and a second story was added in 1857.

In front of the building is the "Frog Hop of Fame", where commemorative plaques are embedded in the sidewalk for the winners of the annual Jumping Frog Jubilee frog jumping contest.

The building, no longer operated as a hotel, is registered as California Historical Landmark #734. It was also listed on the National Register of Historic Places in 1972. It is currently an apartment complex.

See also
 Historic preservation
 History of the National Register of Historic Places
 United States National Register of Historic Places listings

References

External links

National Register of Historic Places
1944 Life Magazine Photos
Jumping Frog Jubilee
Frog Hop of Fame

Hotel buildings on the National Register of Historic Places in California
Buildings and structures in Calaveras County, California
History of Calaveras County, California
Mark Twain
Hotel buildings completed in 1855
California Historical Landmarks
Hotels established in 1851
1851 establishments in California
Defunct hotels in California
National Register of Historic Places in Calaveras County, California